To Hell with the Goddamn Spring is a Colombian play, based on the novel of the same name by Alonso Sánchez Baute (which won the Opera prima award in 2002). It was adapted for the theatre by Colombian director Jorge Ali Triana in 2004.

The play is a monologue given by an average bureaucrat called Edwin Rodríguez Vuelvas, who gradually transforms himself into a drag queen while expressing inner angst and sorrow. The character is reminiscent of Molly Bloom in James Joyce´s  Ulysses; the story also contains elements taken from Proust, kitsch glamour and a sense of ridiculous that recalls the antics of Groucho Marx. The play offers a criticism of intolerance, both from society in general and from within the LGBT community.

Main character
Edwin Rodriguez represents the gay men who migrate from the small cities and provinces of the country to the capital in search of an environment in which they may express themselves more freely. Colombian actor Orlando Valenzuela was chosen for the role based on his experience in the contemporary theatre in Spain and traditional Japanese kabuki theatre.

Plot
The character begins by narrating the present state of his life:  his unrewarding, superfluous bureaucratic job, the relative wealth he enjoys, and his successes in the drag queen beauty contests. It moves on to his memories of his troubled childhood in the Caribbean Region of Colombia. By the time he has transformed, he enjoys moments of temporary happiness as he wins a contest. This concludes with sadness, as he recalls the solitude and emptiness of his life. The final section of the monologue, from which the title of the play is taken, expresses the nihilism that has come to invade the character's attitudes.

The words quoted are nothing more than the lyrics of "Maldita primavera", a popular song first sung in Spanish by Yuri in 1982 and then by others.

See also
LGBT in Colombia

References

External links
Conexioncolombia.com
Revistadiners/com.co

2004 plays
LGBT-related plays
Colombian plays
Monologues
LGBT literature in Colombia
Plays based on novels